Andre Sonko is a politician in Senegal.

Sonko was the Senegalese Minister for Education, and presided over the 1998 UNESCO World Conference for Higher Education.

References 

Year of birth missing (living people)
Living people
Education ministers of Senegal
Interior ministers of Senegal
Government ministers of Senegal